The Fajr-5 (rarely Fadjr-5, "Dawn") is an Iranian 333 mm long-range multiple launch rocket system (MLRS). The Fajr-5 was developed during the 1990s and has since been exported to various armed actors in the Middle East.

The Fajr-5 launcher fires four 6.48 meter long, 333 millimeter-calibre Fajr-5 artillery rockets, with a range of 75 kilometers (50 mi), weighing 915 kilograms each and carrying 175-kg fragmentation warheads with 90 kg of high explosive (HE). Most Fajr-5 rockets are unguided; in 2017 Iran introduced a variant, the Fajr-5C, which adds GPS guidance.

The Fajr-5 is primarily used by the Iranian Army Ground Force to attack large, fixed, high-value targets, like airfields and military bases. In addition, the system is also used by militant groups to target Israel. Finally, the system has a niche role in use by the IRGC-N as an unguided anti-ship rocket system for the Persian Gulf.

Design

MLRS

The Fajr-5 artillery rocket system is installed on a Mercedes Benz 2631 6×6 forward control chassis. To provide a stable firing platform, four hydraulically operated stabilizers are lowered to the ground before firing. Another fully enclosed cabin to the immediate rear of the cab houses the remainder of the crew. This new chassis was unveiled in 2006; some systems have not been upgraded and are still on older chassis.

The Fajr-5 is normally fired from this truck launcher, but it can also be fired individually. The primary role of this artillery rocket system is the engagement of land targets. A naval surface search radar can be added to allow the system to be used in an anti-shipping role.

Fajr-5 MLRS can be networked together, and have a remote-fire capability in which the command vehicle can fire all nearby Fajr-5 systems.

The Fajr-5's circular error probable (CEP) is not known. The Fajr-5's reliability is not known. The Fajr-5's cost is not known. The number of Fajr-5 rockets produced is not known. Whether the Fajr-5 is still in production is not known.

In 2019, the Defense Intelligence Agency described the Fajr-5 as the "most capable" multiple rocket launcher in Iranian service.

Rocket

Basic rocket

The rocket is solid fueled and has a fragmentation high explosive warhead. The rocket is 6.485 meters long, 333mm in diameter, and weighs 907 kg. It has wraparound fins for stabilization in flight, which reach a diameter of 710 mm when extended. The rocket's double base propulsion burns for an average time of 5.3 seconds, reaching a peak velocity of 1100 m/s. The rocket's motor has nine launch nozzles arranged in a circle, which are slanted to help create spin-stabilization in flight. The Fajr-5 rocket carries a 175 kg warhead with a fragmentation radius of 500m.

One source reports that Fajr-5 rockets can likely carry (plain) high explosive, submunitions, incendiary, smoke, or chemical payloads as well. The shelf life of a basic Fajr-5 rocket is 15 years.

Two-stage rocket
Iran produces a two-stage Fajr-5 rocket with extended range. The two-stage Fajr-5 rocket has a length of 9.4 m and a maximum range of 180 km at sea level. This variant has a diameter of 333 mm, like other Fajr-5 rockets, but has fixed fins, which have a diameter of 561 mm. The two-stage Fajr-5 can reach a maximum altitude of 85 km and carries the same 175 kg warhead with a 500m fragmentation radius. This variant is launched from TELs similar to those used for Zelzal rockets, which only have the capacity for a single rocket.

The shelf life of a two stage Fajr-5 rocket is 15 years.

Fajr-5C
In February 2017, Iran revealed a guided version of the Fajr-5, similar to the Chinese SY300, under the name Fajr-5C.

The guided Fajr-5 rocket was briefly mentioned, and believed to be under development, in 2014.

Reloading
When the Fajr-5 is reloaded, the launch tubes (in two groups of two) are detached from the launcher and laid on the ground by a crane (an Italian Effer 155-25). Then, a machine called a "Loading machine" is used to mechanically press the heavy Fajr-5 rockets into their launch tubes one by one. When all the tubes are filled, the crane is used to reattach the launch tubes to the vehicle. Because of the long reload time and large size of the "Loading machine" (12m), the Fajr-5 MLRS is supposed to retreat after firing to safer rear battle areas to reload. A reload takes 2 minutes per rocket.

History

The first Fajr-5 were created when China exported WS-1 MLRS to Iran in the late 1980s/early 1990s. They were then subsequently created and produced by Iran's Aerospace Industries Organization.

Operational history

Iran
As of 2011, the best estimate for the number of Fajr-5 pieces manufactured was "somewhere around 100" or less.

Lebanon
Iran supplied a number of Fajr-5s to Hezbollah in Lebanon beginning in 2002 or 2001. Sources disagree on whether Hezbollah used Fajr-5 rockets in the 2006 Lebanon War, in part because at the time they were confused with similar Khaibar-1 rockets.

Palestinian territories
Fajr-5 rockets are held in the Gaza strip by Palestinian militant groups. The first was fired by Hamas in November 2012. It is believed that manufacture of some sub-components and final assembly may take place in Gaza, but that the critical components of the rocket are furnished by Iran. Iran denied transferring any rockets to Gaza but said they instead transferred technology to manufacture the rocket.

Some Palestinians have named their children after the Fajr-5.

Pillar of Defense
In November 2012 during Operation Pillar of Defense, Hamas and Palestinian Islamic Jihad fired Fajr-5 rockets towards Tel Aviv and Jerusalem. One hit an apartment block in Rishon LeZion. At least 14 rockets were fired in total.

Syria

On May 10, 2018, the IRGC's Quds Force fired 20 rockets into the Israeli-occupied Golan Heights from Syrian territory. Some of these were Fajr-5s.

In December 2018 some Fajr-5 rockets were destroyed in an IAF airstrike.

Iraq
Sporadically, during the US occupation of Iraq (between 2003 and 2011), Iranian Backed militias fired the 333 Fajr-5 at US forces from fabricated rails. In 2015, Iran sent Fajr-5 rockets and launcher systems to Iraq to be used in the War against the Islamic State. It is unknown if they were fired, and the quantity sent is also unknown.

Yemen
The Houthis have unveiled a rocket with similarities to the Fajr-5.

Operators

Current operators
 
 Iranian Army
 Iranian Army Ground Force
 840th Missile Group
 IRGC
 IRGC-N
  Hamas (Izz al-Din al-Qassam Brigades)
  Hezbollah
  Islamic Jihad Movement in Palestine (Al-Quds Brigades)

Former

References

External links
 Fadjr-5 333mm Multiple rocket launcher system (Army recognition)

Self-propelled artillery of Iran
Fajr 5
Fajr 5
Hezbollah rocket systems
Military vehicles introduced in the 1990s